Leorda is a commune in Botoșani County, Western Moldavia, Romania. It is composed of five villages: Belcea, Costinești, Dolina, Leorda and Mitoc.

Natives
 Wojciech Weiss

References

Leorda
Localities in Western Moldavia